Menolak Talak (English: Refusing Divorce) is an Indonesian television legal drama series which premiered 17 January 2022 to 26 February 2022 on ANTV. This show is produced by Tobali Putra Productions. It starred Vino G Bastian, Marsha Timothy, Andi Annisa, Kiky Saputri and Ichal Muhammad in the main roles.

The show ended on 26 February 2022. This show was replaced by Suami Pengganti from 1 March 2022.

Plot 
Natasha Aryapura (Marsha Timothy), a beautiful and ambitious lawyer, is nicknamed the Queen of Divorce Jakarta because she always wins divorce cases.

Natasha has just finished her master's degree abroad. He returned to Indonesia and received news that there was a mediator called the Cool-looking Rujuk Pawang, who had succeeded in thwarting divorce cases and harming Natasha as a legal consultant because many of his clients did not get divorced.

Natasha meets the mediator, who turns out to be Alif Alqodry (Vino G. Bastian), a very pious young man who chooses to be a mediator due to childhood trauma due to the separation of his father, Malih (Malih) and his mother, whom he is still looking for. Alif is assisted by his secretary, Nur (Kiky Saputri) who is coquettish and yearns for Alif.

Natasha and Alif often meet in various divorce cases and become rivals. Until one day, Natasha is faced with a problem when her father, Yan Aryapura (Roy Marten) and mother, Marlina Aryapura (Minati Atmanegara) decide to divorce. Natasha was forced to lower her prestige and contacted Alif to ask for help to keep her parents together.

Without them knowing it, they fell in love with each other. However, among them is Inayah (Andi Annisa), Alif's little friend who secretly loves Alif.

Can Natasha's parents divorce bring Natasha closer to Alif? And who can win Alif's heart?

Cast

Main
Vino G. Bastian as Alif Alqodry: Malih's son; Natasha's love-interest
Marsha Timothy as Natasha Aryapura: Yan and Marlina's daughter; Alif's love-interest

Recurring
Andi Annisa as Inayah: Alif's childhood friend; Dina's daughter
Kiky Saputri as Nur
Roy Marten as Yan Aryapura: Marlina's husband; Alif's father
Minati Atmanagara as Marlina Aryapura: Yan's wife; Alif's mother
Malih as Babeh Malih: Alif's father
Ichal Muhammad as Andre
Dina Lorenza as Lilis: Inayah's mother
Aldi Taher as Ijon
Kintan Putri as Rose: Oding's husband
Abun Hadi as Oding: Rose's wife
Rully Fiss as Kentos
Cahaya Dewi as Nagita
Bima Samudra as Saga
Vidi Bule as Wildan

Special appearances 
 Maya Wulan as Vera
 Temon Templar as Karyo
 Rendy Kjaernett as Rendy
 Selvi Kitty as Selvi
 Adrian Aliman as Adrian
 Asri Welas as Welas
 Ananda George as Ananda
 Andi Soraya as Andi
 Fadlan Muhammad as Fadlan
 Ben Joshua as Ben
 Aulia Sarah as Aulia
 Ferry Irawan as Ferry
 Emma Waroka as Emma
 Reza Bukan as Reza
 Dayu Wijanto as Dayu

Awards and nominations

References

External links 

 

Indonesian drama television series
Indonesian television soap operas